Stretton Old Hall is in the parish of Stretton in Cheshire, England.  It was built in the 17th century, and extended in the 19th century.  The house is constructed in brick with a slate roof.  The entrance front includes a two-storey porch with a shaped gable, and a larger shaped gable on a cross wing to the right.  It is recorded in the National Heritage List for England as a designated Grade II listed building.

See also

Listed buildings in Stretton, Cheshire West and Chester
Stretton Hall, Cheshire
Stretton Lower Hall

References

Houses completed in the 17th century
Country houses in Cheshire
Grade II listed buildings in Cheshire
Grade II listed houses